Bhiksu University of Sri Lanka was founded in 1996 and is located in Anuradhapura in Sri Lanka.

References

Universities in Sri Lanka
Buildings and structures in Anuradhapura
Education in Anuradhapura
1996 establishments in Sri Lanka
Educational institutions established in 1996
Buddhist universities and colleges